Issam Al-Qarni (Arabic: عصام القرني; born 29 April 1995 in Jeddah) is a Saudi professional football player who currently plays as a midfielder for Al-Arabi.

Honours
Al-Wehda
Prince Mohammad bin Salman League: 2017–18

References

1995 births
Living people
Saudi Arabian footballers
Association football midfielders
Ittihad FC players
Al Nassr FC players
Al-Wehda Club (Mecca) players
Damac FC players
Ohod Club players
Hetten FC players
Wej SC players
Al-Entesar Club players
Al-Arabi SC (Saudi Arabia) players
Sportspeople from Jeddah
Saudi Professional League players
Saudi First Division League players
Saudi Second Division players